We Have Our Moments is a 1937 American comedy mystery film directed by Alfred L. Werker and starring Sally Eilers, James Dunn and Mischa Auer.

Cast

References

Bibliography
 Fowler, Karin J. David Niven: A Bio-bibliography. Greenwood Publishing Group, 1995.

External links

1937 films
American comedy mystery films
1930s comedy mystery films
Films directed by Alfred L. Werker
Universal Pictures films
American black-and-white films
1937 comedy films
1930s English-language films
1930s American films